Brandesburton is a village and civil parish in the East Riding of Yorkshire, England.

The civil parish is formed by the village of Brandesburton and the hamlets of Burshill and Hempholme.
According to the 2011 UK census, Brandesburton parish had a population of 1,522, an increase on the 2001 UK census figure of 1,348.

St Mary's Church, which is surrounded by its churchyard in the north-east corner of the village, is a large, medieval building, with tower, nave, aisles and chancel. It was largely built out of cobbles, but has an early brick clerestory and later south porch. Exhibiting some fragments of Norman work (including a priest's door), it principally dates from the 13th to the 15th centuries, and was restored in 1892. Inside are two noteworthy brasses: on the south side of the chancel the fragments of a (rare) bracket-brass, and on the north side more substantial, full-size brasses to John St Quintin, a former Lord of the Manor, and his wife. The church has been designated a Grade I listed building. Among those buried in its churchyard is the Revd Dr John Hymers JP DD FRS (died 1887), former rector and the founder of Hymers College, Hull.

On the village green is a Grade II listed market cross.

Brandesburton amenities include the Billabong jet ski centre which operates throughout the year, the Hainsworth Park Golf Club, The Burton Lodge Hotel, the Black Swan and Dacre Arms pubs, and The Dacre Lakeside camping and Caravan Park. Premier Modular, an off-site building company who specialise in modular buildings, are based in the village.

The village is situated off the A165 which used to pass through the village until the opening of a bypass of it, and neighbouring village Leven, in 1994. A railway station was proposed in 1901 as part of the North Holderness Light Railway between Beverley and North Frodingham, but the line was never built.

Remains of mammoths and prehistoric elephant tusks have been discovered near the village.

From the 1930s and into the Second World War RAF Catfoss was located just to the north-east of the village.

Governance
The civil parish was in the Beverley and Holderness parliamentary constituency until the 2010 general election when it was transferred to the constituency of East Yorkshire.

References

External links

Brandesburton Village Website

Villages in the East Riding of Yorkshire
Civil parishes in the East Riding of Yorkshire